Luoyixi Town is a Town in Guzhang County of China's Hunan Province. It is located on a bay of the Fengtan Reservoir (formerly, a southern tributary of the You River). As of the census of 2010, it has a total population of 10,000.

Hongshilin (红石林, "Red Stone Forest") National Geopark is located on the reservoir's bank northeast of town.

The Luoyixi Global boundary Stratotype Section and Point is named after the town. The actual point is on the shore of the Fengtan Reservoir, some 4 km northwest (upstream) from Luoyixi Town, halfway to the neighboring Wangcun Town.

See also 
 List of township-level divisions of Hunan

Notes

Towns of Xiangxi Tujia and Miao Autonomous Prefecture
Guzhang